Cheam Road is a cricket ground in Sutton, London (formerly Surrey).  The first recorded match on the ground was in 1940, when Sutton United Tramps played London Counties.

The ground held a single match in the 1955 Minor Counties Championship when the Surrey Second XI played the Warwickshire Second XI.  More recently, the ground has held Surrey Second XI matches in the Second XI Championship and the Second XI Trophy.

Surrey played a single List-A match against Derbyshire at Cheam Road in the 1969 Player's County League.

In local domestic cricket, Cheam Road is the home ground of Sutton Cricket Club who play in the Surrey Premier League.  Historically the cricket ground was part of the Lower Cheam House Estate and was donated to the cricket club.  Having gone without a pavilion since 1858, the club bought the old waiting room at Sutton railway station and installed it at the ground.  In 1906 a wooden pavilion was built, but this was destroyed during The Blitz.  A replacement pavilion was constructed in 1955.

References

External links
Cheam Road on CricketArchive
Cheam Road on Cricinfo

Cricket grounds in London
Buildings and structures in the London Borough of Sutton
Sport in the London Borough of Sutton
Surrey County Cricket Club grounds
Sports venues completed in 1858
1858 establishments in the United Kingdom